"The Historical Praise of Reason" (original French title: "Éloge historique de la Raison") is a panegyric in the form of a biography, written by the philosopher Voltaire in 1774.

Synopsis 
This fable in the form of a panegyric tells the story of the allegorical figure of Reason, who, after hiding in a well for years, finally emerges and realizes that her reign may have returned.

External links 
 English translation by Adi. S Bharat in 'Pusteblume' journal of translation.
 "Éloge historique de la Raison" (in French). Wikisource.
 "Éloge historique de la Raison" audiobook

Works by Voltaire
Panegyrics